Paulina Valenzuela Río (born 23 November 1984) is a Chilean teacher who was elected as a member of the Chilean Constitutional Convention.

References

External links
 
 BCN Profile

Living people
1984 births
Chilean people
21st-century Chilean politicians
Metropolitan University of Educational Sciences alumni
Cardinal Silva Henríquez Catholic University alumni
Non-Neutral Independents politicians
Members of the Chilean Constitutional Convention
21st-century Chilean women politicians